Price Run is a stream in the U.S. state of West Virginia.

The stream was named after the local Price family.

See also
List of rivers of West Virginia

References

Rivers of Pocahontas County, West Virginia
Rivers of West Virginia